The men's K-1 1000 metres event was an individual kayaking event conducted as part of the Canoeing at the 1996 Summer Olympics program.

Medalists

Results

Heats
The 23 competitors first raced in three heats. The top three finishers from each of the heats advanced directly to the semifinals while the remaining competitors competed in the repechages.

Repechages
Two repechages were held. The top four finishers in each repechage and the fastest fifth-place finisher advanced to the semifinals.

Semifinals
The top four finishers from each of the two semifinals along with the fastest fifth-place finisher advanced to the final.

Final
The final took place on August 3.

Robinson led for the first 250 meters before Holmann took over to lead at 500 meters. Bonomi took the lead at the 750 meter mark before Holmann, using a wooden boat, pulled away to win by over a boat length.

References
1996 Summer Olympics official report Volume 3. pp. 169–70. 
Sports-reference.com 1996 K-1 1000 m results.
Wallechinsky, David and Jaime Loucky (2008). "Canoeing: Men's Kayak Singles 1000 Meters". In The Complete Book of the Olympics: 2008 Edition. London: Aurum Press Limited. p. 473.

Men's K-1 1000
Men's events at the 1996 Summer Olympics